Neolepetopsis densata is a species of sea snail, a true limpet, a marine gastropod mollusk in the family Neolepetopsidae, one of the families of true limpets.

Description

Distribution
East Pacific Rise near 12° N.

Habitat 
a sulphide chimney

References

External links

Neolepetopsidae
Gastropods described in 1990